"Untitled" (Perfect Lovers) is a work of conceptual art produced by Félix González-Torres in an edition of three, plus one artist's proof, between 1987 and 1990. It consists of two identical synchronized clocks, that will eventually fall out of sync. An ambiguous work of art, many have interpreted it to be a commentary on González-Torres' partner's struggle with acquired immune deficiency syndrome (AIDS) and death at large.

One of González-Torres' most famous works, it has appeared in over 70 exhibitions and has inspired multiple homages. When displayed at exhibitions and similar establishments it must adhere to specific guidelines illustrated by González-Torres such as the clocks having to be the same dimensions.

Background and conception 
In 1987, González-Torres' partner Ross Laycock was diagnosed with AIDS. Influenced by the idea that "art should act right now," the artist created three editions of the piece and one artist's proof between 1987 and 1990. In a letter sent to Laycock in 1988, he showed a rough sketch of the piece, entitled merely Lovers. In the letter, González-Torres ruminates about time, writing: 

The piece can be interpreted as a protest against the censorship of "gay art," knowing that it would be difficult for critics to show that "money is being expended for the promotion of homosexual art," with a work of art so simplistic and abstract in nature. According to Shawn Diamond, the piece was created to "memorialize the love he shared," with Laycock. González-Torres described creating the piece as "the scariest thing I have ever done".

Description and showcase 
"Untitled" (Perfect Lovers) consists of two identical commercial wall clocks displayed side by side, ideally above head height. The original clocks measure 13 1/2 in. each in diameter. For showcasing the piece González-Torres created detailed instructions. The clocks must be of exactly the same dimensions and design and they must touch. The hands must be set to the same time and be able to be perpetually reset, causing the piece to theoretically last forever. The clocks may fall out of synch however if one of the clocks stop, it must be fixed or replaced and both clocks reset.

Matthew Isherwood said that "like all of Torres’s work, “Untitled” (Perfect Lovers) uses materials that could be considered everyday or mundane to extend and explore queer personal desire". One of González-Torres' artworks from 1991, "Untitled" (Double Portrait), closely resembles "Untitled" (Perfect Lovers); featuring two identical circles.

Three of the four versions of "Untitled" (Perfect Lovers) (1987-1990) are owned by public collections: the Dallas Museum of Art; Glenstone, Potomac, Maryland; and the Wadsworth Atheneum, Hartford, Connecticut. The fourth is owned by an unknown private collection.

Following Laycock's death in 1991, the artist created a nearly identical work by the same name. "Untitled" (Perfect Lovers) (1991) similarly consists of two identical wall clocks but also includes light blue paint, painted onto the wall of the installation location. The later work is owned by the Museum of Modern Art, New York, and was formally considered by the artist to be a separate work of art from "Untitled" (Perfect Lovers) (1987-1990).

Analysis 
With "Untitled" (Perfect Lovers) González-Torres wanted the audience to infer their own meaning. Margarita Vega, noted that "What differentiates "Untitled" (Perfect Lovers) from regular clocks is nothing physical, but rather the assignment of function that will be reflected on some kind of status indicators". Art critic Robert Storr expanded on this, writing:

Most interpret the piece to be a mediation on Laycock's AIDS diagnosis, declining health, eventual death and their relationship at large. Public Delivery stated that the two clocks represent "two mechanical heartbeats," commenting on "personal loss as well as the temporal nature of life." Museum curator Jasper Sharp believed the piece to be a memento mori which represents the short-lived nature of life. Catherine Ruello shared similar sentiments, saying that it "involves the themes of 'vanitas'." James E. Rondeau noted that it was start of González-Torres' "examination of coupling and mortality".

According to Adair Rounthwaite, González-Torres' use of a clock, an item which only matters to the living, is a "visual metaphor for the crossover between that time and the nontime of the dead." Rounthwaite also stated that the time measured represents life itself and that the piece was a response to the trauma of AIDS. Margaret Anne Wojton, said that "The two clicking clocks represented Gonzalez-Torres's vantage point of his anguish as caregiver and survivor." She also viewed the piece as an "existential metaphor," for González-Torres' death anxiety.

Rondeau felt that the stipulation that they're identical was a reference to same-sex couples. Suzanne Perling Hudson said that although "the piece is clearly “about” González-Torres and his partner, it is also about any lovers, be they homosexual or heterosexual, and the reality of impermanence and the threat and fear of imminent loss.

Shawn Diamond believed that the piece "depicted two figures always in proximity but unable to unite and become a single body." Kevin Busit echoed similar sentiments, "They'll never be one...The fabric of their being ensures that eventually they’ll end up in conflict." Isherwood felt that because the clocks could be reset, there was a sense of hope and optimism in the work. He also noted that "by connoting his queer identity, rather than “evoking it”, González-Torres allows “Untitled” (Perfect Lovers) to become both intimately personal and widely social". Helen Molesworth, chief curator at the Institute of Contemporary Art, viewed it as a metaphor for the relationship between art historian and art itself.

Exhibitions 

"Untitled" (Perfect Lovers) first exhibition was at Jay Gorney Modern Art, New York, from October 20 to November 20, 1990. It was later included in González-Torres’ 1994 exhibition, “Traveling,” at The Renaissance Society in Chicago. This version was made specifically for the exhibition and was neither dated or signed. As of November 30, 2019 the piece has appeared in 75 exhibitions.

Legacy 
According to Public Delivery, "Untitled" (Perfect Lovers) is one of González-Torres' most famous works. In 2002, Tobias Wong produced Perfect Lovers (Forever). Identical in all but one aspect, that being Wong's clocks are synchronized with the U.S. Atomic Clock, ensuring they both stay accurate to within one second over a period of a million years.

In 2008, Welsh artist Cerith Wyn Evans created a remake entitled "Untitled" (Perfect Lovers + 1). The only difference between +1 and the original is the addition of one clock. In 2016, Frieze choose the piece as a "key artwork" from 1991–2016.

References

Notes 

Found object
Conceptual art
1991 works
LGBT art in the United States
Clocks in the United States
Félix González-Torres